On Christmas Night is an album by Cherish the Ladies, released in 2004 on the Rounder Records label.

Track listing
 "On Christmas Night/Charles O'Conor" – 3:28
 "The Castle of Dromore" – 4:05
 "Henry Roe McDermott/The Holly and the Berry" – 4:21
 "Hark! The Herald Angels Sing/The Traveler/Lilies in the Field/The Blacksmith's Reel" – 6:22
 "The Distressed Soldier/Angels We Have Heard on High/The Fairy Reel" – 6:54
 "The Little Drummer Boy" – 3:57
 "O Holy Night/Cill Chais" – 6:23
 "Ding Dong Merrily on High/The Cordal Jig/Old Apples in Winter/Con Cassidys" – 4:43
 "Silent Night" – 5:45
 "Oh Little Town of Bethlehem/The Ballintore Fancy/The Kerry Reel/Limestone Rock" – 4:56

References

Cherish the Ladies albums
2004 Christmas albums
Christmas albums by American artists
Celtic Christmas albums